Beit Emanuel Progressive Synagogue is a progressive synagogue located in Parktown, Johannesburg. The synagogue was established in 1954 and is one of the largest progressive Jewish congregations in South Africa. Israeli-born, Rabbi Sa'ar Shaked has been Beit Emanuel's congregational rabbi since 2013. It is an affiliate of the South African Union for Progressive Judaism (SAUPJ), which is part of the World Union for Progressive Judaism (WUPJ). Congregational rabbi, Shaked is currently involved in efforts to establish a Rabbinic Academy and Higher Education Institution in Gauteng.

Practice
Jocelyn Hellig, professor of religious studies and one of the best-known interpreters of South African Judaism, described the Progressive community as conservative in religious practice. This was also given as an explanation for the relatively modest presence of Masorti Judaism in the country (Hellig 1987; Shain 2011). In 1993 there were divisions in Johannesburg's Progressive community when Beit Emanuel's congregational rabbi, Ady Asabi declared that it and the Imanu-Shalom congregations would become independent and Masorti synagogues, breaking with the SAUPJ and Progressive Judaism. A court case ensued to retain both of the congregations under the SAUPJ. Beit Emanuel returned to the SAUPJ following an agreement and Shalom became independent and Masorti (Dubb and Shain 1995). Today the synagogue has moved away from the formality of conventional Reform Judaism and instead concentrates on prayers (ancient and modern) that encourage greater congregant participation.

References

Bibliography

External links
Beit Emanuel official website

Buildings and structures in Johannesburg
Synagogues in South Africa
Jews and Judaism in Johannesburg
Jews and Judaism in South Africa
Progressive Judaism in South Africa
Synagogues completed in 1954
1954 establishments in South Africa
20th-century religious buildings and structures in South Africa